This is a list of Swedish sportspeople.



A
Ara Abrahamian - wrestler
Tommy Albelin - ice hockey player
Daniel Alfredsson - ice hockey player
Helen Alfredsson - golfer
Marcus Allbäck - football player
Therese Alshammar - swimmer
Agneta Andersson - canoe racer
Arne Andersson - athlete
Frank Andersson - wrestler
Håkan Andersson - ice hockey scout
H. Johan Andersson - ice hockey player
Johan Andersson - ice hockey player
Johan A. Andersson - ice hockey player
Kennet Andersson - football player
Patrik Andersson - football player
Mikael Appelgren - table tennis player
Johan Asplund - ice hockey player
P. J. Axelsson - ice hockey player

B
Johan Backlund - ice hockey player
Christian Bäckman - ice hockey player
Nicklas Bäckström - ice hockey player
Bengt Baron - swimmer
Malin Baryard-Johnsson - show jumper
Stellan Bengtsson - table tennis
Kajsa Bergqvist - high jumper
Jonas Björkman - tennis
Elias Bjuhr - hockey player
Jesper Blomqvist - football player
Jan Boklöv - ski jumper
Martin Boquist - handball player
Arne Borg - swimmer
Björn Borg (1919–2009) - swimmer
Björn Borg (born 1956) - tennis player
Kenny Bräck - race car driver
Thomas Brolin - football player
Ricky Bruch - discus thrower

C
Per Carlén - handball player
Robert Carlsson - ice hockey player

D
Ulf Dahlén - ice hockey player
Kjell Dahlin - ice hockey player
Martin Dahlin - football player
Alx Danielsson - racing driver
Sven Davidson - tennis player

E
Nancy Edberg - swimmer
Stefan Edberg (born 1966) - tennis player
Alexander Edler - ice hockey player
 Tzahi Elihen (born 1991) - Israeli footballer
Per Elofsson - cross-country skier
Sten Ekberg - track and field athlete
Nils Ekman - ice hockey player
Oliver Ekman-Larsson - ice hockey player
Ludmila Engquist - hurdler
Thomas Enqvist - tennis player
Marcus Ericsson - racing driver
Anders Eriksson - ice hockey player
Kenneth Eriksson - rally driver
Loui Eriksson - ice hockey player
Sven-Göran Eriksson - football manager
Conny Evensson - ice hockey manager

F
Niclas Fasth - golfer
Magdalena Forsberg - biathlete
Peter Forsberg - ice hockey player
Johan Franzén - ice hockey player
Gert Fredriksson - canoe racer
Lars Frölander - swimmer
Ove Fundin - speedway

G
Anders Gärderud - steeplechase athlete
Peter Gentzel - handball player
Thomas Gradin - ice hockey player
Gillis Grafström - figure skater
Anders Graneheim - bodybuilder
Gunnar Gren - football player
Nicklas Grossmann - ice hockey player
Susanne Gunnarsson - Canoe racer
Andreas Gustafsson (born 1981) - race walker
Anton Gustafsson - ice hockey player
Bengt-Åke Gustafsson - ice hockey player
Tomas Gustafson - speed skater
Alexander Gustafsson - Mixed Martial Artist

H
Gunder Hägg - middle distance runner
Joakim Haeggman - golfer
Linda Haglund - sprinter
Yared Hagos - ice hockey player
Peter Hagström - former ice hockey player
Per Hallin - ice hockey player
Inge Hammarström - former ice hockey player
Kurt Hamrin - football player
 Johan Harmenberg - Olympic champion épée fencer
Niclas Hävelid - ice hockey player
Johan Hedberg - ice hockey player
Victor Hedman - ice hockey player
Jonathan Hedström - ice hockey player
Ronnie Hellström - football player
Stefan Holm - high jumper
Johan Holmqvist - ice hockey player
Leif "Honken" Holmqvist - ice hockey player
Michael Holmqvist - ice hockey player
Tomas Holmström - ice hockey player
Samuel Hübinette - driver in the Formula D drifting series
Kristian Huselius - ice hockey player
Fredrik Hynning - ice hockey player

I
Zlatan Ibrahimović - football player
Emma Igelström - swimmer
Klas Ingesson - football player
Andreas Isaksson - football player

J
Jonas Jacobsson - sport shooter
Anders Järryd - tennis player
Jonas Jerebko - basketball player
Sixten Jernberg - cross-country skier
Bengt Johansson - handball player/coach
Calle Johansson - ice hockey player
Ingemar Johansson - boxer
Joachim Johansson - tennis player
Jonas Johansson - ice hockey player
Kjell Johansson - table tennis player
Stefan Johansson - Formula One driver
Thomas Johansson - tennis player
Kim Johnsson - ice hockey player
Jörgen Jönsson - ice hockey player
Kenny Jönsson - ice hockey player
Lars Jonsson - ice hockey player
Tomas Jonsson - ice hockey player

K
Charlotte Kalla - cross-country skier
Kim Källström - football player
Anders Kallur - ice hockey player
Jenny Kallur - 100 metres hurdles runner
Susanna Kallur - 100 metres hurdles runner
Anna-Karin Kammerling - swimmer
Andreas Karlsson - ice hockey player
Erik Karlsson - ice hockey player
Nils 'Mora-Nisse' Karlsson - cross-country skier
Peter Karlsson - table tennis 
Ola Kimrin - American football player
Ove Kindvall - football player
Carolina Klüft - heptathlete
Ulrika Knape - diver
Carin Koch - golfer
Armand Krajnc - boxer
Annichen Kringstad - orienteer
Niklas Kronwall - ice hockey player
Staffan Kronwall - ice hockey player
John Kvist - football player

L
Carl Martin "Rekkles" Erik Larsson - league of legends
Gabriel Landeskog - ice hockey player
Adam Larsson - ice hockey player
Gunnar Larsson - swimmer
Henrik Larsson - football player
Eric Lemming - track and field athlete
Nicklas Lidström -  ice hockey player
Nils Liedholm - football player
Andreas Lilja - ice hockey player
Anna Lindberg - diver
Ola Lindgren - handball player
Peja Lindholm - curler
Peter Lindmark - ice hockey player
Catarina Lindqvist Ryan - tennis player
Joakim Lindström - ice hockey player
Sanny Lindström - ice hockey player
Willy Lindström - ice hockey player
Freddie Ljungberg - football player
Hanna Ljungberg - football player
Mikael Ljungberg - wrestler
Håkan Loob - ice hockey player
Peter Loob - ice hockey player
Stefan Lövgren - handball player
Henrik Lundqvist - ice hockey player
Joel Lundqvist - ice hockey player

M
Hanna Marklund - football player
Kim Martin - ice hockey player
Björn Melin - ice hockey player
Olof Mellberg - football player
Fredrik Modin - ice hockey player
Eric Moe - ice hockey player
Torgny Mogren - cross-country skier
Mustafa Mohamed - athlete
Malin Moström - football player
Doug Murray - ice hockey player
Mats Wilander - tennis player

N
Markus Näslund - ice hockey player
Mats Näslund - ice hockey player
Liselotte Neumann - golfer
Catrin Nilsmark - golfer
Marcus Nilson - ice hockey player
Joakim Nilsson (born 1966)
Joakim Nilsson (born 1985)
Joakim Nilsson - javelin
Jonny Nilsson - speed skater
Kent Nilsson - ice hockey player
Magnus Nilsson - ice hockey player
Mats Nilsson - javelin
Robert Nilsson - ice hockey player
Roland Nilsson - football player and manager
Torbjörn Nilsson - football player
Björn Nittmo - American football kicker
Joakim Noah - basketball player
Anette Norberg - curler
Gunnar Nordahl - football player
Niklas Nordgren - ice hockey player
Tina Nordlund - football player
Magnus Norman - tennis player
Mattias Norström - ice hockey player
Fredrik Nyberg - Alpine skier
Michael Nylander - ice hockey player
Peter Nylander - ice hockey player
Stefan Nystrand - swimmer 	
Bob Nystrom (born 1952) - Swedish-Canadian ice hockey player

O
Johnny Oduya - ice hockey player
Mattias Öhlund - ice hockey player
Fredrik Olausson - ice hockey player
Christian Olsson - triple jumper
Jon Olsson - Skier
Staffan Olsson - handball player
Linus Omark - ice hockey player

P
Magnus Pääjärvi-Svensson - ice hockey player
Samuel Påhlsson - ice hockey player
Jesper Parnevik - golfer
Anja Pärson - alpine skier
Joakim Persson - football player
Jörgen Persson - table tennis player
Ronnie Peterson - Formula One driver
Johan Petersson - handball player
Annelie Pompe – freediver
David Printz - ice hockey player

R
Thomas Ravelli - football player
Tony Rickardsson - speedway rider
Paolo Roberto - boxer
Jonny Rödlund - football player
Maria Rooth - ice hockey player
Thomas Rundqvist - ice hockey player
Johan Ryno - ice hockey player

S
Henri Saint Cyr - dressage rider
Ulrich Salchow - figure skater
Börje Salming - ice hockey player
Tommy Salo - ice hockey goalkeeper
Kjell Samuelsson - ice hockey player
Magnus Samuelsson - World's Strongest Man in 1998
Mikael Samuelsson - ice hockey player
Ulf Samuelsson - former ice hockey player
Lotta Schelin - football player
Daniel Sedin - ice hockey player
Henrik Sedin - ice hockey player
Agne Simonsson - football player
Patrik Sjöberg - high jumper
Fredrik Sjöström - ice hockey player
Sarah Sjöström - swimmer
Ragnar Skanåker - pistol shooter
Lennart "Nacka" Skoglund - football player
Christian Söderström - ice hockey player
Annika Sörenstam - golfer
Alexander Steen - ice hockey player
Anders Steen - ice hockey player
Thomas Steen - ice hockey player
Ingemar Stenmark - alpine skier
Henrik Stenson - golfer
Ulf Sterner - ice hockey player
Niklas Stråhlén - windsurfer
Anton Strålman - ice hockey player
Staffan Strand - high jumper
Stig Strand - alpine skier
Pär Styf - ice hockey player
Oscar Sundh - ice hockey player
Mats Sundin - ice hockey player
Niklas Sundström - ice hockey player
Patrik Sundström - ice hockey player
Peter Sundström - ice hockey player
Gunde Svan - cross-country skier
Johan Svedberg - ice hockey player
Lennart Svedberg - ice hockey player
Björn Svensson - ice hockey player
Tomas Svensson - handball player
Victoria Svensson - football player

T
Henrik Tallinder - ice hockey player
Dick Tärnström - ice hockey player
Jeffery Taylor - basketball player
Mikael Tellqvist - ice hockey player
Jonas Thern - football player
Daniel Tjärnqvist - ice hockey player
Mathias Tjärnqvist - ice hockey player
Sven Tumba - ice hockey player

W
Jan-Ove Waldner - table tennis player
Niclas Wallin - ice hockey player
Mats Waltin - ice hockey player
Fredrik Warg - ice hockey player
Thomas Wassberg - cross-country skier
Mattias Weinhandl - ice hockey player
Mattias Wennerberg - ice hockey player
Pernilla Wiberg - alpine skier
Mats Wilander (born 1964) - tennis player
Björn Wirdheim - Champ car driver
Magnus Wislander - handball player

Z
Erkan Zengin - football player
Henrik Zetterberg - ice hockey player
Pär Zetterberg - football player
Zlatan Ibrahimovic- football player

See also
List of Swedish Olympic medalists
Swedish athletes
Swedish basketball players  
Swedish canoeists
Swedish footballers
Swedish golfers
Swedish high jumpers
Swedish ice hockey players
Swedish show jumping riders 
Swedish sport wrestlers
Swedish swimmers
Swedish table tennis players

Sports
Swedish